Morten Berglia (born 3 August 1958) is a Norwegian orienteering competitor.

He won a gold medal in the individual competition at the 1983 World Orienteering Championships, and obtained a bronze medal in 1981. He is also three times Relay World Champion, as a member of the Norwegian winning teams in 1983 (with Øyvin Thon, Tore Sagvolden and Harald Thon), 1985 (with Atle Hansen, Tore Sagvolden and Øyvin Thon) and 1987 (with Håvard Tveite, Tore Sagvolden and Øyvin Thon).

References

1958 births
Living people
Norwegian orienteers
Male orienteers
Foot orienteers
World Orienteering Championships medalists
20th-century Norwegian people